Bennett Vander Plas (born September 19, 1998) is an American basketball player who played college basketball for the Ohio Bobcats and Virginia Cavaliers.

Vander Plas was the Division I Academic All-American of the Year in 2022 and 2023.

High school career
Vander Plas graduated from Ripon High School in Ripon, Wisconsin. Over his playing career he averaged 16 points, 10 rebounds, 3.6 assists, 1.8 blocks and 1.8 steals while playing for his father Dean Vander Plas. He was a three-year team captain and earned First Team All-East Central Conference three times. After both his junior and senior year he earned conference player of the year and first team all-state.  As a senior he led Ripon to an undefeated regular season and a state tournament appearance.  He played AAU basketball with the Wisconsin Playmakers.  He was rated a 2-star recruit by Rivals and committed to Ohio University.

College career

Ohio
Vander Plas redshirted during the 2017-18 season with a leg injury.  He averaged 8.6 points, 6.8 rebounds, and 1.5 assists per game during his freshman season  In spite of only starting one game he earned MAC Freshman of the Year honors. He started all 31 games his sophomore year while averaging 15.7 points and 6.9 rebounds a game. He was named All-MAC Third Team for the first time.

He averaged 12.8 points, 5.8 rebounds, and 3.8 assists his junior season and earned All-MAC Third Team for the second straight season. He was named an Academic All-American after the season. He scored 26 points in the MAC tournament semi-final against Toledo and 9 points in the MAC Championship against Buffalo. Ohio upset defending national champion Virginia in the first round of the NCAA tournament.  Vander Plas led Ohio with 17 points including 10 straight for the Bobcats near the end of the second half which saw the Bobcats go from down one to ahead by seven.

Vander Plas averaged 14.2 points, 6.8 rebounds, and 3.1 assists for his senior season and notched only the fourth triple double in program history against Central Michigan. He scored a career high 30 points in a home win against Miami. He earned All-MAC First Team honors and was named Division I Academic All-American of the Year by the College Sports Information Directors of America, now known as College Sports Communicators (CSC). After five years at Ohio, Vander Plas had earned a bachelor's degree in communications, a master’s degree in sport administration, and a master's degree in management. After the season he entered the transfer portal

Virginia
On April 23, 2022, Vander Plas announced that he had committed to Virginia.  Vander Plas averaged 24.8 minutes, 7.4 points, and 4.6 rebounds starting most regular season games for the ACC co-champion Cavaliers.  During a practice prior to Virginia's quarterfinal game of the ACC tournament vs. North Carolina he broke his hand and he missed the entirety of the post season.  He repeated as Division I Academic All-American of the Year.

Personal life
He is the son of Ripon High School basketball coach Dean Vander Plas who played with current Virginia head coach Tony Bennett at Wisconsin-Green Bay under Tony's father and then head coach Dick Bennett.  Vander Plas is named after the Bennett family.

Career statistics

College

|-
| style="text-align:left;"| 2017–18
| style="text-align:left;"| Ohio
| style="text-align:center;" colspan="11"|  Redshirt
|-
| style="text-align:left;"| 2018–19
| style="text-align:left;"| Ohio
| 31 || 1 || 23.2 || .407 || .309 || .707 || 5.2 || 1.5 || 0.9 || 0.5 || 8.6
|-
| style="text-align:left;"| 2019–20
| style="text-align:left;"| Ohio
| 31 || 31 || 33.0 || .492 || .299 || .593 || 6.9 || 2.8 || 1.0 || 0.7 || 15.7
|-
| style="text-align:left;"| 2020–21
| style="text-align:left;"| Ohio
| 25 || 25 || 33.8 || .432 || .347 || .764 || 5.8 || 3.8 || 1.4 || 0.6 || 12.8
|-
| style="text-align:left;"| 2021–22
| style="text-align:left;"| Ohio
| 35 || 35 || 35.3 || .457 || .338 || .725 || 6.8 || 3.1 || 1.8 || 0.5 || 14.3
|-
| style="text-align:left;"| 2022–23
| style="text-align:left;"| Virginia
| 29 || 15 || 24.8 || .412 || .303 || .509 || 4.6 || 1.4 || 0.8 || 0.4 || 7.4
|- class="sortbottom"
| style="text-align:center;" colspan="2"| Career
| 151 || 107 || 30.1 || .447 || .321 || .658 || 5.9 || 2.5 || 1.2 || 0.5 || 11.8

Source:

References

External links
Virginia Cavaliers bio
Ohio Bobcats bio

1998 births
Living people
American men's basketball players
Basketball players from Wisconsin
Ohio Bobcats men's basketball players
People from Ripon, Wisconsin
Virginia Cavaliers men's basketball players